Kristian Jakobsson (born January 18, 1996) is a Swedish ice hockey player. He is currently playing with Sparta Warriors of the GET-ligaen (SHL).

Jakobsson made his Swedish Hockey League debut playing with Modo Hockey during the 2014–15 SHL season.

References

External links

1996 births
Living people
Modo Hockey players
Mora IK players
Sparta Warriors players
Swedish ice hockey forwards